Agonopterix abditella is a moth of the family Depressariidae. It is found in Russia (Daghestan).

References

Moths described in 1959
Agonopterix
Moths of Europe